Imerius (Himerius, Imier, Immer) of Immertal (d. ca. 620 AD) was a monk, hermit, and missionary in the present Swiss Jura.  The name of the town of Saint-Imier refers to him.

Imerius was born in Lugnez, a small village now in the Canton of Jura about 570. He spent some time in Lausanne and made a voyage to Palestine. After he had returned he lived in the valley of Saint-Imier as a hermit. The legend says that Bishop Marius of Lausanne gave him the piece of land at Saint-Imier as a present, but this legend is historical very uncertain. In the 9th century, a monastery was built over his tomb.

Literature
 Pierre-Olivier Walzer, La vie des saints du jura, Réclère (1979), p. 99 - 132. 
 Friedrich Wilhelm Bautz: HIMERIUS, (Hymerius, Imier, Immer), Heiliger. In: Biographisch-Bibliographisches Kirchenlexikon (BBKL). Band 2, Bautz, Hamm 1990, Sp. 875.

Hermits
620 deaths
7th-century Christian saints
Year of birth unknown